Horodyszcze  is a village in the administrative district of Gmina Wisznice, within Biała Podlaska County, Lublin Voivodeship, in eastern Poland.

The village has a population of 841.

Horodyszcze, which had town rights from mid-16th century until 1879, dates back to the Middle Ages. Its name comes from Eastern Slavic word horodyszcze, which means gord. The village was first mentioned in documents from 1446, and until 1944, was a private property of several noble families, including the Polubinski.

The village has remains of an early medieval settlement with a cemetery. Both are now archaeological sites, and are located south of Horodyszcze. Furthermore, the village has a Classicistic palace and park (1818–1824), designed by Antonio Corazzi for Julian Frankowski.

References

Villages in Biała Podlaska County
Podlachian Voivodeship
Siedlce Governorate
Kholm Governorate
Lublin Voivodeship (1919–1939)